Three ships of the French Navy have borne the name Latouche-Tréville in honour of the 19th century politician and admiral Louis-René Levassor de Latouche Tréville.

French ships named Latouche-Tréville 
  (1860), a steamer aviso.
  (1894), an armoured cruiser 
  (1984), a  anti-submarine frigate.

Notes and references

Notes

References

Bibliography 
 
 

French Navy ship names